is a Japanese animated television series produced by Sunrise. The series is directed by Katsuyoshi Yatabe and written by Yasushi Hirano with both character and mecha designs done by Masayuki Hiraoka and Kunio Okawara respectively. It aired on Nagoya TV from February 3, 1990, to January 26, 1991, compiling up to 48 episodes.

Exkaiser is the first installment in Takara and Sunrise's Brave series franchise, spanning up to 8 separate installments. It is generally one of the more influential anime in the 1990s, which revitalized the Super Robot genre in that time through both the series' reception as well as its toy sales. It would be later referenced and homaged in several other animated works.

Story

A group of space police led by Exkaiser are chasing after the Geisters, an evil gang of treasure thieves. Upon arriving on Earth, Exkaiser and his team, the Kaisers, house their spirits into vehicles all over Japan to create physical bodies for their energy-based forms. Exkaiser inhabits a car belonging to the Hoshikawa family and befriends a third grade boy named Kouta Hoshikawa. Exkaiser and his allies must unite their powers in order to fight the Geisters and prevent them from stealing Earth's artifacts.

Development
Brave Exkaiser was a co-production between Sunrise and Takara, with the latter producing the toyline based on the series. Sunrise, who was assigned to animate the series, planned the show to be a solo series and will not have any spinoffs nor start a franchise. It was also aimed for kids at that time. Its premise was also based on one central theme: "Searching for One's Treasure", reflecting the value of important things that can only be understood after losing. This theme became the central point of the series's finale. While developing the mecha designs, Takara based the concept of the mechas from the Transformers toyline, as the concept of Alien Robots coming from space, though depicted them as Super Robots that combine both sophisticated and simple designs in their various forms, something that is later passed to the Transformers franchise in its later incarnations. In addition, the concept of a boy befriending a robot, a concept seen back in Transformers Victory was implemented in the series as seen in the bond between Exkaiser and Kouta.

Upon release of the anime, sales of the series' toys were among the highest in 1990 according to Takara, also describing it as their "best year" in sales. Though production narrowed down a bit due to the release of the Super Famicom in Japan in that same year with the year-end sales being slow due to a large amount of inventory of toys. Keiichi Tanaka, stated that "(In Kansai), There was no inventory left because we made adjustments by transferring between wholesalers at the end of the year." Takara foresaw the potential of the series as a franchise not as a toys franchise but as "a series with a compelling storyline and drama for older audiences", which paid off in Brave future installments.

Media

Anime
Brave Exkaiser originally aired on Nagoya TV from February 3, 1990, to January 26, 1991, replacing Jushin Liger on its timeslot. The series' music was composed by Kohei Tanaka, who would later compose music for The King of Braves GaoGaiGar, the final entry in the Brave series.

Video Games
Brave Exkaiser appears in the two Brave Saga games which were published by Takara and released on the PlayStation in 1998 and 2000 respectively as well as appearing in Brave Saga: Shinsou Astaria for the Game Boy Color in 2001 and later New Century Brave Wars for the PlayStation 2 in 2005. In 2019, Brave Exkaiser appeared in the Super Robot Wars X-Ω mobile game, making it the third Brave series to debut in the Super Robot Wars franchise, after GaoGaiGar's debut in 2nd Super Robot Wars Alpha and Might Gaine's debut in Super Robot Wars V.

References

Works cited

External links
勇者エクスカイザー  (Japanese)
 

1990 anime television series debuts
Sunrise (company)
Super robot anime and manga
Brave series